The Paradise Post is a twice-a-week newspaper in Paradise, California. The newspaper is part of the Digital First Media corporation. It was previously owned by Lowell Blankfort and Rebele Rowland, before selling the paper to Dean Singleton and MNG in 2003.

The publisher of the paper is Jim Gleim. The managing editor is Rick Silva.

The paper has a circulation of about 7,000, and publishes Wednesday and Saturday. It was first published as the Paradise Post in 1947.

References

External links

Newspapers published in California
Paradise, California